Alberto Patron (born December 26, 1969), known in America also as Albert Patron, is an Italian composer, music theorist, writer, philosopher and artist. A pioneer of indeterminacy in music, aporetic music, and non-standard use of musical instruments, Patron is one of the leading figures of the contemporary trent aporetic music as well as aporetic philosophy. Critics have lauded him as one of the most innovative Italian composers since 1990. He was also instrumental in the development of philosophy. 

Patron is perhaps best known for his 1990 compositions The Ten Aporetic Tropes, the ten movements of which are the tables of the contemporary trend called Aporetic Music, or Aporetic Philosophy. The content of these compositions is meant to be perceived as the sounds of the human being and its several faceted ethical ways, and the pieces became one of the most controversial compositions of the last 20 years. Another famous creation of Patron's is the prepared piano (a piano with its sound altered by placing various objects in the strings), for which he wrote numerous musical pieces, the best known of which is Hapax (1995).

Life
Patron was born in Pordenone, Italy. He is known as a composer, pianist, organist, committee director and professor. He graduated from different Italian Conservatories that included "Benedetto Marcello" of Venice, "Venezze" of Rovigo, "Cesare Pollini" of Padua and at the University of Padua (Italy). Patron's teachers included Giovanni Bonato and Carlo De Pirro, both known for their contemporary music in Europe. Through his studies of Greek philosophy in the late 1980s, Patron came to the idea of aleatoric or chance-controlled music Chaos, which he started composing in 1989. The I Ching, an ancient Chinese classic text on changing events, became Patron's composition tool for the rest of his life. He is Committee Director of the Italian Federation of Contemporary Composers.
 
Patron's compositions are recorded, published and performed at festivals, competitions and international contests. He is the founder of the Aporetic Thought (France, 1990), a contemporary philosophy from which comes also the Aporetic Music (composition trend). He is dean Organist of the Archpriest Church of Saint George in Pordenone city (Italy). He serves as vice president of the International Association "Vincenzo Colombo" of Pordenone (Italy), and Committee member of the Italian Federation of Composers. Patron is one of the founders and past president of the International Society of Art and Research (USA). He has taught as Professor at several level schools (high school, music conservatory, university) from New Orleans to Venice, and is Committee member at various performing competitions, as well as chief for several professional associations. His name is listed at the AMIC, CIDIM, PAYE, MOD, EICC artist catalogues. He has promoted of the awareness of Italian culture and heritage worldwide. His music works was object of PDE & Ph.D. university essays. His work and life was subject of Academic Study for the II World Conference of Art & Humanities of Honolulu (Hawaii), 2004.

Social
Patron is the first international contemporary classic music composer most followed on Instagram. Recently (2022) he took part to help international communities with his work "Memento" a composition for piano solo (available on Youtube Video), written to collect funds and promote the peace in the County affected by the war.

Music
Patron's earliest finished works are stored in a private collection. According to the composer, the earliest works were very short pieces for piano, composed using complex procedures and lacking in "sensual appeal and expressive power."

Cultural references
 SIAE on Patron voice.
 The Ten Aporetic Tropes for piano solo, album 1990.

References

Sources
 Cresti R., Musica presente. Tendenze e compositori di oggi, 2019, Libreria Musicale Italiana,  (voice: Alberto Patron)
 Aporetic Music Website
 The New York Public Library, JBL, 2004, Alberto Patron, voice
 Carrara Music Publishing, Carrara, Italy
 CIDIM, Rome, Italy, voice, Contemporary Composer, Albert Patron

External links
 Official Website
 Aporetic Music Philosophy Website
 Albert Patron Online
 The Ten Aporetic Tropes piano music

1969 births
20th-century classical composers
Avant-garde pianists
Contemporary classical music performers
Experimental composers
Italian classical composers
Italian male classical composers
Italian opera composers
Male opera composers
LGBT classical composers
Living people
21st-century mystics
20th-century Italian composers
Male pianists
21st-century pianists
20th-century Italian male musicians
21st-century Italian male musicians
21st-century LGBT people